JaQuori McLaughlin (born January 29, 1998) is an American professional basketball player for the Santa Cruz Warriors of the NBA G League. He played college basketball for the Oregon State Beavers and the UC Santa Barbara Gauchos.

High school career
McLaughlin attended Peninsula High School in Gig Harbor, Washington. He averaged 19.3 points, 9.1 assists and 5.5 steals per game as a senior and was named Washington Mr. Basketball. McLaughlin left as the school's all-time leader in points, assists and three-pointers. He had originally committed to playing college basketball for Oregon State before switching his commitment to Washington. He later recommitted to Oregon State over offers from Utah and Wisconsin.

College career
As a freshman at Oregon State, McLaughlin averaged 10.5 points and 3.3 assists per game. He set a program freshman record with 58 three-pointers. Before his second year, McLaughlin began suffering from post-traumatic stress disorder after witnessing a terrorist attack during his team's summer trip to Spain. Six games into the season, he left the team. McLaughlin was granted a redshirt and transferred to UC Santa Barbara. He averaged 10.3 points and 3.2 assists per game as a sophomore. In his junior season, he averaged 13.4 points and 4.1 assists per game. McLaughlin was named to the All-Big West Honorable Mention. As a senior, he averaged 16 points, 5.2 assists, 3.5 rebounds and 1.5 steals per game, helping UC Santa Barbara win the Big West regular season and tournament title. McLaughlin was named Big West Player of the Year as well as Big West tournament MVP. Following the season, McLaughlin declared for the 2021 NBA draft forgoing his extra season of eligibility.

Professional career

Dallas Mavericks (2021–2022)
After going undrafted in the 2021 NBA draft, McLaughlin signed a two-way contract with the Dallas Mavericks on September 3, 2021. Under the terms of the deal, he split time between the Mavs and their NBA G League affiliate, the Texas Legends. On January 10, 2022, he was waived by the Mavericks.

Santa Cruz Warriors (2022–present)
On January 14, 2022, McLaughlin was acquired in a trade by the Santa Cruz Warriors of the NBA G League. However, he was waived on February 26, after suffering a season-ending injury.

On October 24, 2022, McLaughlin rejoined the Santa Cruz Warriors roster for training camp.

Career statistics

NBA

Regular season

|-
| style="text-align:left;"| 
| style="text-align:left;"| Dallas
| 4 || 0 || 2.8 || .000 || .000 || .000 || .0 || .5 || .0 || .0 || .0
|- class="sortbottom"
| style="text-align:center;" colspan="2"| Career
|  4 || 0 || 2.8 || .000 || .000 || .000 || .0 || .5 || .0 || .0 || .0

College

|-
| style="text-align:left;"| 2016–17
| style="text-align:left;"| Oregon State
| 32 || 30 || 33.8 || .383 || .367 || .743 || 2.2 || 3.3 || .8 || .3 || 10.5
|-
| style="text-align:left;"| 2017–18
| style="text-align:left;"| Oregon State
| 6 || 5 || 26.0 || .238 || .000 || 1.000 || 2.7 || 3.7 || 1.5 || .5 || 2.7
|-
| style="text-align:left;"| 2018–19
| style="text-align:left;"| UC Santa Barbara
| 32 || 32 || 32.3 || .360 || .343 || .763 || 2.8 || 3.2 || .8 || .2 || 10.3
|-
| style="text-align:left;"| 2019–20
| style="text-align:left;"| UC Santa Barbara
| 30 || 30 || 34.2 || .444 || .407 || .799 || 3.3 || 4.1 || 1.0 || .2 || 13.4
|-
| style="text-align:left;"| 2020–21
| style="text-align:left;"| UC Santa Barbara
| 26 || 26 || 32.3 || .488 || .408 || .832 || 3.5 || 5.2 || 1.5 || .2 || 16.0
|- class="sortbottom"
| style="text-align:center;" colspan="2"| Career
| 126 || 123 || 32.8 || .415 || .370 || .794 || 2.9 || 3.9 || 1.0 || .2 || 11.9

Personal life
McLaughlin's father, Jason, serves as an assistant basketball coach at Tacoma Community College, where his younger brother, Elijah, plays the point guard position.

References

External links

UC Santa Barbara Gauchos bio
Oregon State Beavers bio

1998 births
Living people
American men's basketball players
Basketball players from Tacoma, Washington
Dallas Mavericks players
Oregon State Beavers men's basketball players
People from Port Angeles, Washington
Point guards
Santa Cruz Warriors players
Texas Legends players
UC Santa Barbara Gauchos men's basketball players
Undrafted National Basketball Association players